Localization or localisation may refer to:

Biology
 Localization of function, locating psychological functions in the brain or nervous system; see Linguistic intelligence
 Localization of sensation, ability to tell what part of the body is affected by touch or other sensation; see Allochiria
 Neurologic localization, in neurology, the process of deducing the location of injury based on symptoms and neurological examination
 Nuclear localization signal, an amino acid sequence on the surface of a protein which acts like a 'tag' to localize the protein in the cell
 Sound localization, a listener's ability to identify the location or origin of a detected sound
 Subcellular localization, organization of cellular components into different regions of a cell

Engineering and technology
 GSM localization, determining the location of an active cell phone or wireless transceiver
 Robot localization, figuring out robot's position in an environment
 Indoor positioning system, a network of devices used to locate objects or people inside a building
 Navigation, determining one's position accurately on the surface of earth
 Radiolocation, finding the location of something via radio waves
 Satellite navigation, a positioning and navigation technique aided by satellites

Adaptation to language, etc.
 Language localization, translating a product into different languages or adapting a product to a country or region
 Internationalization and localization, the adaptation of computer software for non-native environments, especially other nations and cultures
 Video game localization, preparation of video games for other locales
 Dub localization, the adaptation of a movie or television series for another audience

Mathematics
 Localization of a category, adding to a category inverse morphisms for some collection of morphisms, constraining them to become isomorphisms
 Localization of a ring and a module, in abstract algebra, a formal way to introduce the "denominators" to a given ring or a module
 Localization of a topological space, the localization of topological spaces at primes
 Localization theorem, theorem to infer the nullity of a function given only information about its continuity and the value of its integral

Physics
 Anderson localization, in condensed matter physics, the absence of diffusion of waves in a disordered medium
 Weak localization, a physical effect which occurs in disordered electronic systems at very low temperatures
 Supersymmetric localization, a method to compute exact correlation functions of certain supersymmetric operators in supersymmetric quantum field theories

Other uses
 Localization Era (1900-1300 BCE), the fourth and final period of the Indus Valley Tradition
 The opposite of economic globalisation
 Internationalization and localization, the adaptation of products for international use by conforming them to the conventions of each target locale, including language and culture.

See also 
 Local theory, a physical theory that obeys the principle of locality
 Local (disambiguation)
 Local group (disambiguation)
 Localism (disambiguation)
 Locality (disambiguation)
 Locus (disambiguation)
 Type locality (disambiguation)
 Locale (computer software)